Iligluruk Creek is a stream in North Slope Borough, Alaska, in the United States. It is a tributary of Kokolik River.

Iligluruk is derived from an Eskimo word meaning "burnt looking".

See also
List of rivers of Alaska

References

Rivers of North Slope Borough, Alaska
Rivers of Alaska